Tritonia episcopalis is a species of dendronotid nudibranch. It is a marine gastropod mollusc in the family Tritoniidae.

Distribution
This species was found in the Bay of Biscay, at 2170 m depth, .

References

Tritoniidae
Gastropods described in 1977